Kisco may refer to:

Kisco River, a creek in New York
Mount Kisco, New York, a community in Westchester County
Kisco Senior Living, in Carlsbad, California